Vitthalbhai Hansrajbhai Radadiya (8 November 1958 – 29 July 2019) was an Indian politician who was a member of the 15th Lok Sabha of India. He represented the Porbandar constituency of Gujarat and was a member of the Bharatiya Janata Party political party. He was a five time Member of the Legislative Assembly and twice Member of parliament, Lok Sabha.

Career
Radadiya had a B.A. degree and worked as a Social worker and politician. He ran a few schools through trusts. He was a BJP MLA who had joined Shankersinh Vaghela's Rashtriya Janata Party and afterward the Congress. In the early 1990s Radadiya joined the  BJP, later he moved to the Congress Party. In 2013, he re-joined BJP. He represented Dhoraji Assembly constituency five times.

He was also director of IIFCO company and the chairman of the Rajkot district co-operative bank.

Radadiya had sparked a controversy in October 2012 also after brandishing a gun at a toll booth employee after he asked for his identity card.

Posts held

Radadiya won Lok Sabha seat for Congress in 2009, but gave up the seat after he became MLA for Congress from Dhoraji after 2012 assembly elections. He resigned from Congress immediately after those elections and contested Lok Sabha by-poll of 2013 on BJP ticket and won.

Personal life
He was married to Chetna Ben. His son Jayesh Radadiya is also a politician and holds the portfolio for Gujarat Minister of Tourism and Aviation. Radadiya's son Kalpesh had died of cardiac arrest when in his 20s. In 2014, Radadiya married off Kalpesh's widow Manisha in her second marriage to Kalpesh's friend Hardik Chovatiya.

Radadiya died on 29 July 2019 due to  cancer.

See also

List of members of the 15th Lok Sabha of India
Politics of India
Parliament of India
Government of India
Gujarat Legislative Assembly

References 

India MPs 2009–2014
2019 deaths
1958 births
Indian National Congress politicians from Gujarat
Gujarat MLAs 1990–1995
People from Rajkot
Lok Sabha members from Gujarat
India MPs 2014–2019
People from Porbandar district
Gujarat MLAs 1995–1998
Gujarat MLAs 1998–2002
Gujarat MLAs 2002–2007
Gujarat MLAs 2007–2012
Rashtriya Janata Party politicians
Bharatiya Janata Party politicians from Gujarat